The Pan American Games is a quadrennial event which began in 1951. The Pan American Sports Organization accepts only athletes who are representing one of the organisation's member states (most of which are within the Americas) and recognises records set at editions of the Pan American Games. The Games records in athletics are the best marks set in competitions at the Games. The athletics events at the Games are divided into four groups: track events (including sprints, middle- and long-distance running, hurdling and relays), field events (including javelin, discus, hammer, pole vault, long and triple jumps), road events and combined events (the heptathlon and decathlon).

Cuban athlete Ana Fidelia Quirot and Mexican Graciela Mendoza are the only competitors to hold records in two separate events. Quirot is the record holder over both 400 and 800 metres, while Mendoza holds the 10 and 20 kilometre walk records. The 10 km walk event was discontinued after 1995.  The two nations that most represented in the record list are Cuba (with 8 male and 10 female record holders) and the United States (with six record holders of each sex. Furthermore, all but one of the records in the defunct athletic events are held by US athletes. Of the other countries, Brazil, Jamaica, and Mexico each have five records.

Men's records

Women's records

Statistics

Totals

Records in defunct events

Men's events

Women's events

References

General
Pan American Games Athletics Results. GBR Athletics. Retrieved 2009-07-11.
Biscayart, Eduardo (2007-07-30). Brazilian de Almeida wins Marathon - Pan-Am Games, Final Day. IAAF. Retrieved 2009-07-11.

Specific

External links
 Pan American Games 2011 official website

Records
Pan American Games
Athletics